Prasad Tanpure (born 21 July 1942) is an Indian politician who was a member of the 12th Lok Sabha representing the Kopargaon constituency. He belongs to the Nationalist Congress Party.

References

Living people
Indian National Congress politicians
1942 births
India MPs 1998–1999
Lok Sabha members from Maharashtra
People from Ahmednagar district
Nationalist Congress Party politicians from Maharashtra